Quantization is the process of constraining an input from a continuous or otherwise large set of values (such as the real numbers) to a discrete set (such as the integers). The term quantization may refer to:

Signal processing 
 Quantization (signal processing)
 Quantization (image processing)
 Color quantization
 Quantization (music)

Physics 
 Quantization (physics)
 Canonical quantization
 Geometric quantization

 Discrete spectrum, or otherwise discrete quantity
 Spatial quantization
 Charge quantization

Computing 
 The process of making the signal discrete in amplitude by approximating the sampled signal to the nearest pre-defined level is called as quantization

Linguistics 
 Quantization (linguistics)

Similar terms 
 Quantification (science)